Eric A. LeVine (born November 8, 1969) is an American entrepreneur based in Seattle. He has been the founder and CEO of CellarTracker since 2003. He has been a Council Member at the United States Holocaust Memorial Museum since September, 2016.

Early life 
Levine currently lives in Seattle, Washington with his wife, Suzan G. LeVine who served as United States Ambassador to Switzerland and Liechtenstein from 2014 to 2017, and their 2 children, Sidney and Talia LeVine.

References

External links

1969 births
Living people
Place of birth missing (living people)
Businesspeople from Seattle
American philanthropists
American chief executives
Harvard College alumni